The Power of Love: The Best of Jennifer Rush is a compilation album by American singer Jennifer Rush, released by Sony's Columbia Records in 2000. While it was the third full-priced compilation to be issued by Sony since Rush's departure from Columbia in 1989, it was the first to be handled by Sony U.K.

Sony Germany (who, as she was based in Germany, had handled all of Rush's releases during her tenure with the Columbia label) had previously released two full-priced compilation albums on Columbia of Rush's material: 1991's The Power of Jennifer Rush (released across Europe) and The Best of Jennifer Rush in 1999 (released to limited European markets and the South African market).

For this compilation, Sony U.K. focused on Rush's success in the United Kingdom, giving it the title of her biggest-selling hit there and opening the album with that song. The featured versions of "The Power of Love" and "Ring of Ice" (a top 20 U.K. hit for Rush and her second biggest hit there) are the mixes found on the 7" singles issued in that country (as remixed by Walter Samuel), rather than the original mixes found on the German 7" singles.

Track listing
 "The Power of Love" (Walter Samuel U.K. 7" Remix) (edited from Jennifer Rush (International version) [1985])
 "Destiny" (from Movin' [1985])
 "Flames of Paradise" – duet with Elton John (Album version) (from Heart Over Mind [1987])
 "Love Is the Language (Of the Heart)" (from Wings of Desire [1989])
 "I Come Undone" (from Heart Over Mind [1987])
 "Ring of Ice" (Walter Samuel U.K. 7" Remix) (from Jennifer Rush (International version) [1985])''
 "Same Heart" – duet with Michael Bolton (from Passion [1988])
 "If You're Ever Gonna Lose My Love" (from Movin' [1985])
 "Hero of a Fool" (from Movin' [1985])
 "Call My Name" (from Heart Over Mind [1987])
 "Now That It's Over" (from Passion [1988])
 "Keep All the Fires Burning Bright" (from Passion [1988])
 "Live Wire" (from Movin' [1985])
 "Pleasure" (from Wings of Desire [1989])
 "Angel" (from Wings of Desire [1989])
 "Down to You" (from Heart Over Mind [1987])
 "Till I Loved You" – duet with Plácido Domingo (from Goya: A Life in Song (European edition) [1989])

External links
The Power of Love: The Best of Jennifer Rush at Discogs

2000 compilation albums
Jennifer Rush albums